Adventurers Guild was a game created by Hugh Bayer in 1989, and released commercially in 1990. Started as a play-by-mail game, the rise of the Internet gave way for the game's evolution to a play-by-e-mail system. This move from the postal service to electronic medium gave the game a lot of room for growth and advancement, as turn orders could now be submitted via a website instead of needing to be mailed in through the postal service. This move also gave players a chance to participate more in the lore of the land of Varna.

Development
Developed initially as a play-by-mail game, reviewer Mark Macagnone felt that at the outset in 1990, Adventurers Guild was very similar to Reality Simulation Inc's Duelmaster's PBM game. Reviewer Spike Y Jones felt that a key difference between the two games was that Adventurer's Guild allowed the player control over character creation while Duelmaster provides a "prerolled" character, allowing some modifications. Jones also pointed to combat strategy, turn formatting, and other differences between the games.

Game play
In the initial years of the game, Adventurer's Guild was an open-ended play-by-mail game. In it, players trained their characters at the Guild before adventuring. Character traits were chosen for sex, race, and height, as well as considerations for handedness, "original abilities" (strength, dexterity, stamina, and cunning), and weapons training.

The game has two main ways that the player interacts with the world of Adventurers Guild. Each method has its own effects on the game and world, as well as on the player's character.

The first of these two ways is through the use of orders, which are processed in alternating fashion weekly between the
two guild cities (Antar one week, Barstow the next, then back to Antar). This is the original method for interaction within the game,
and is the way to both improve a character and have him/her interact with the land of Varna. Orders are input at the website, and can
include things such as guild battles, making money, building shrines to a deity, or adventuring in the wilderness, as well as many other
possible actions. Each of these actions are ways to improve the character's abilities and allow him/her to interact with the world he/she resides in.

The other way of interaction is through the AG Yahoo! group. This group allows players to roleplay character(s) with others within the game. This could lead to bitter rivalries, great alliances, or to helping to shape the world through interaction with both the PCs and NPCs brought to life through Hugh and the players. All of these things allow players to become more involved in the AG world and so makes the place much more enjoyable. It also gives players a way to interact in the time between turns.

Reception
Reviewer Mark Macagnone in 1990 did not have a positive view of the game, giving it one or two stars. Reviewer Spike Y Jones had a more positive view of the game in 1991, noting it as one potentially worth a try. In 1995, Brian Kellner wrote a positive review in Paper Mayhem, describing the game as "well thought out", with only a "minor complaint" about rulebook organization.

See also
 List of play-by-mail games

References

Bibliography

Further reading

External links
 

Play-by-email video games
Play-by-mail games
Video games developed in the United States